Lgovo is a rural locality (a village) in Yershovskoye Rural Settlement, Sheksninsky District, Vologda Oblast, Russia. The population was 15 as of 2002.

Geography 
Lgovo is located 23 km north of Sheksna (the district's administrative centre) by road. Yershovo is the nearest rural locality.

References 

Rural localities in Sheksninsky District